The Eurasian Development Bank (EDB) is an international development finance institution investing in the development of the economies, trade and other economic ties, and integration in Eurasian countries. The EDB was founded in 2006 and is headquartered in Almaty, Kazakhstan. The Bank has a branch in St. Petersburg and representative offices in Nur-Sultan, Bishkek, Dushanbe, Yerevan, Minsk, and Moscow.

History of the EDB
The founding of the Eurasian Development Bank on 12 January 2006 was initiated by the Presidents of Russia and Kazakhstan. It began operating in June 2006.

Armenia and Tajikistan joined the EDB in 2009, Belarus in 2010, and the Kyrgyz Republic in 2011.  In January 2013, the Organisation for Economic Cooperation and Development recognised the EDB as a multilateral financial institution.

Membership 
The present membership of the Bank consists of 6 countries. Other states and international organisations can become members by acceding to the Agreement Establishing the Bank.

Ranked on the basis of paid-up capital (as of January 2023) major shareholders include:
 Russia (44.78 %)
 Kazakhstan (37.28%)
 Belarus (5.21 %)
 Tajikistan (4.25%)
 Kyrgyzstan (4.22%)
 Armenia (4.22%)

Potential members 
 During an interview, Dmitry Pankin, chairman of the EDB's management board, stated that there were 12 countries expressing to join, including Azerbaijan, Egypt, Israel, India, Indonesia, Iran, Japan, Mongolia, Singapore, Thailand, the Republic of Korea and Vietnam.
  Moldova: In November 2019, Moldova confirmed its intention to join the Eurasian Development Bank during a meeting in Moscow.
  Hungary: Hungary expressed its interest to join the Eurasian Development Bank. Hungarian finance minister Mihály Varga stated that the Hungarian government is aiming for full membership by 2020. As a former member of Comecon, Hungary will be the first former Warsaw Pact state to join the EDB.

Mission and strategy
The EDB's mission is to promote market economies and economic growth in its member states and help expand trade and other economic ties between them by means of investment.

The EDB's Strategy for 2022–2026 sets out the following development objectives:
 Strengthening the Bank's unique integration role in the EAEU+. The Bank's total investment will amount to US$10.9 billion;
 Implementing integration mega-projects in transport infrastructure and logistics, food security, water and energy: the Eurasian Transport Corridor, the Eurasian Commodity Distribution System, and the Central Asian Water and Energy Complex;
 Developing the EDB's digital projects by focusing on support for the digital agendas of the Bank's member countries to promote their digital transformation;
 Promoting the UN Sustainable Development Goals and ESG approaches in the Bank's corporate governance, and increasing financing for the Bank's green and social projects;
 Enhancing operations in the countries of the EDB's minority shareholders. Five-year strategies have been developed for each of the Bank's member states, tailored to their economic and investment profiles. The Bank's investment in Armenia, Kyrgyzstan, and Tajikistan is expected to reach US$500 million by 2026.

International cooperation
The EDB cooperates with other international organisations, national and international development institutions, academic and civil society organisations, associations and unions to support the Bank's activities in the member states and beyond.

The EDB has held observer statuses at:
 the United Nations General Assembly (since 2007);
 the Eurasian Group on Combating Money Laundering and Financing of Terrorism (EAG) (since 2008);
 the UNCTAD Trade and Development Board;
 the International Investment Bank (since 2014).

The EDB:
 is a member of the Kazakhstan Stock Exchange (KASE), the International Capital Market Association (ICMA), and the International Swaps and Derivatives Association (ISDA);
 participates in the Multilateral Financial Institutions’ Working Group on Environmental and Social Standards (since 2012);
 cooperates with the World Economic Forum (WEF; since 2014).

Activities
The Eurasian Development Bank's activities in Eurasia include financing investment projects that help improve living standards and develop the business and financial environment in the countries by lending to state or private enterprises, public-private partnerships (PPPs), equity participation, issuing guarantees, financing private investment funds, and providing loans to commercial banks for corporate on-lending. The Bank also implements digital transformation projects in the EAEU+ and provides financing to banks, companies, and enterprises by investing in new and ongoing projects and supporting investment projects in the pipeline. The EDB's portfolio mainly consists of projects in transport infrastructure, digital systems, green energy, agriculture, manufacturing, and mechanical engineering. The projects that have been implemented with the EDB's participation and financing include the following:
 Reconstruction of the Almaty Airport terminal (Kazakhstan);
 Construction of the Big Almaty Ring Road (Kazakhstan);
 Construction of the Turkistan Airport terminal (Kazakhstan);
 Construction of the Saryarka gas pipeline (Kazakhstan);
 Smart lighting system in Atyrau (Kazakhstan) – Impact Awards 2021 Winner;
 Construction of the Central Ring Road in Moscow;
 Construction of the Azov Wind Farm (Russia);
 Construction of the Western High-Speed Diameter in St. Petersburg;
 Complete replacement of passenger railcars Armenia's national railway carrier;
 Financing the Russian-Kyrgyz Development Fund's targeted programmes;
 Construction of the Polotsk Hydropower Plant on the Western Dvina River (Belarus).

Fund for Digital Initiatives
The Eurasian Development Bank's Fund for Digital Initiatives was established on 30 June 2020. The aim of the fund is to support digital transformation in the EDB member states. The fund provides project financing and grants and supports digital projects in healthcare, trade, public governance, culture, tourism, sports, education, environmental protection, energy, data protection, transport, logistics, manufacturing, agriculture, the labour market and migration, as well as financial technology and smart cities.

The first project implemented by the Fund for Digital Initiatives was the COVID-19-Free Travel mobile app aimed at allowing the free and safe movement of people among countries during the coronavirus pandemic. The app makes it possible to retrieve, store and display PCR test results and vaccination records.

Technical assistance
The Technical Assistance Fund is the EDB's vehicle for providing expertise and support for projects in the pipeline to relieve potential borrowers from some of the additional burdens and speed up the drafting of project documents. The fund has three strands: technical assistance in preparing investment projects; technical assistance in expanding the Bank's investment activities; and subsidising interest rates in investment projects.

Research
The Bank's own research activities have made it a reputable think tank. The EDB is involved in major research and applied projects; prepares reports and recommendations on regional economic integration for member governments; regularly hosts conferences and round table discussions; and publishes sector- and theme-specific reviews, macroeconomic papers analysing economic developments in and forecasts for the region, as well as information on regional integration, development bank activities, and investment project financing in the EAEU+.
In 2021, the EDB research team published the following studies: The International North–South Transport Corridor: Promoting Eurasia's Intra- and Transcontinental Connectivity; EDB Monitoring of Mutual Investments for the twelve CIS countries and Georgia; Investment in the Water and Energy Complex of Central Asia; and   Uzbekistan and the EAEU: Prospects and Potential Impact of Economic Integration.

Mobilising finance
The EDB works actively with financial institutions to mobilise long-term resources in the capital markets, which are the main source of funding for the Bank's investment activities.

The sources of market financing include:
 Eurobonds issued under the EMTN programme;
 bonds issued in local markets;
 securities issued under the ECP programme; 
 bilateral bank loans.

Financial performance
The Bank's charter capital totals US$7 billion, including US$1.5 billion of paid-in capital and US$5.5 billion of callable capital. The current investment portfolio as of 1 March 2022 totalled US$3.902 billion and the cumulative investment portfolio (including completed projects) US $10.448 billion. A total of 84 projects are being financed.

Environmental and social responsibility
In 2012, the Bank's management board approved an Environmental and Social Responsibility Framework aimed at reducing the negative environmental impacts of EDB-funded projects. The Bank's investment projects include those focusing on environmental protection, socio-economic development, and the efficient use of natural resources. Also in 2012, the Bank joined the Multilateral Financial Institutions’ Working Group on Environment.

In 2019, the EDB's management stated that the Bank would focus on environmental projects, primarily in the electricity and renewable energy sectors.

In 2020, the Bank became a shareholder of the AIFC Green Finance Centre established to develop and promote green finance in Kazakhstan and Central Asia. The Centre assists potential issuers, investors and market players in preparing for the issuance of green bonds on the AIFC Exchange.

Between 2017 and 2020, the EDB financed renewable energy projects with a total installed capacity of about 500 MW to the tune of more than US$540 million. In 2020, the Bank approved a Renewable Energy Programme for 2020–2024, which will finance projects with an installed capacity of 500 MW for a total of up to US$600 million. By 2024, the EDB plans to extend up to US$1 billion to renewable energy projects.

In 2021, the EDB financed the construction of the Azov wind farm, the first one in the Unified Energy System of Russia to remotely control the flows of both active and reactive power generated by the facility.

In 2021, the EDB published its Green and Social Debt Instruments Framework.

In September 2021, the Bank issued green bonds on the Kazakhstan Stock Exchange (KASE). ACRA, as an accredited verifier, confirmed the issue's compliance with the ICMA green bond principles and included it in its register. This was followed by the issuance in November of social bonds for projects implemented in Kazakhstan.

In December 2021, the EDB and the Global Energy Association published a report entitled Green Technologies for Eurasia's Sustainable Future aimed at helping to reduce the carbon footprint in Eurasia.

The Bank is also involved in the development of transport corridors across Eurasia. The relevant projects are expected to halve transport-related  emissions on the China–EAEU–EU axis. The EDB is also working on a development scheme for Central Asia's water and energy complex. Realising the region's hydro potential will reduce  emissions by 5 million tonnes per year while improvements in irrigation will help to minimise climate-related risks for Central Asia. The Bank's strategy for 2022–2026 prioritises environmental and resource efficiency. Each project is internally reviewed for its carbon footprint.

Management
The Bank’s management structure is made up of the Bank’s Council, the Management Board, and the Chairman of the Management Board.

The Bank’s Council is its supreme management body in charge of the general management of its operations. Each member state of the Bank appoints to the Council an authorised representative and his or her deputy who become Council members.

The Bank’s Management Board is a permanent collective executive body governed by the Bank’s Council.

The Chairman of the EDB Management Board is Nikolai Podguzov.

See also

Commonwealth of Independent States
Eurasian Customs Union
Eurasian Union
Multilateral Development Banks
Post-Soviet states

References

External links
 

Banks established in 2006
International banking institutions
International finance institutions
Eurasian Economic Union